Holly Hills may refer to:
 Holly Hills, Colorado, an enclave in Denver
 Holly Hills, St. Louis, a neighborhood in Missouri
 Holly Hills, Virginia, a community
 Holly Hills, a character in Diary of a Wimpy Kid

See also
 Holly Hill (disambiguation)